Alan Mauritz Swanson (born Chicago, Illinois October 29, 1941) is an American composer and academic who lives in the Netherlands.

He took his BA (1963) and MA (1965) at Indiana University and his PhD at the University of Chicago (1973). In between he studied at Stockholm University. As an academic, he taught at Augustana College (Rock Island, Illinois), Brigham Young University (Provo, Utah), and the University of Groningen (the Netherlands), and came to specialize in the theatre and opera of the seventeenth and eighteenth centuries.  Trained as a singer, many of his early compositions are for voice, but recent work has tended to be varied in form: string quartets, a viola concerto, a partita for piano, and others. In 2006, he was honored for his academic and community work by being appointed Officer in the Order of Oranje-Nassau.

Partial works list

Choir 
1988: Missa Aestiva SSAATTBB[3]
2011: Alleluia: Laudate Dominum SATB
2013/2014: Veni sancte spiritus/Komm heiliger Geist, Gott und Herr – SSATB
2020: O sacrum convivium for SSA
2020: La primera leccion for SSA and piano
2022: O magnum mysterium for Choir (SSA)

Songs 
1995: “Il pleut dans mon cœur" – Voice, Pno
2008: Song-Set No. 1, High voice, Piano
2010: Song-Set No. 2: Fem sånger until texter av Arthur Landfors – Low voice, Piano
2017: Sur un poète moderne – Low voice, Piano 
2018: À Arthur Rimbaud – Low voice, Piano
2020: Song-Set No. 3 for Voice and Piano
2021: miniLieder divers short songs for Voice and Piano (mostly)
2022: Song-Set 4, for Middle Voice and Piano

Chamber 
1992–93: Essay for String Quartet
1993–2003: Second Essay for String Quartet
2006: Equale per quattro tromboni, "Academic Discussion in Groningen"
2011: Partita pour piano
2011/12: Algorithm. Percussion solo
2012/2015: Trio for Piano, Violin, and Cello
2015: Equale per quattro sassofoni, Tre frasi di Dante – SATBaritone Saxophones
2016: Away - A Trio for Violist, Dancer, and Chair
2016: Trio No. 2, for Piano, Violin, and Cello 
2017: One, Two, Three – String Trio 
2018: Résonances – Violoncello 
2019: Air et Badinages – Piano 
2019: Something understood – Clarinet 
2019: Words – High voice, Cello
2019: Trouvé sur un pont inconnu -Flute solo
2019: Spirals for clarinet solo 
2017-2020: A Third Essay for String Quartet
2020: There Were Twelve for violin solo
2021: In Porter County for String Quartet and Medium Voice
2021: A Fourth Essay for String Quartet
2021: Hexagons for Marimba, Xylophone, Tympani, and Conga Drums
2022: Correlations for String Orchestra
2022: Seven Ways of Looking at a Line for String Trio

Orchestra 
2013: Concerted Music for Viola and Strings. – Strings
2022: Correlations

Libretti 
2018: A Deep Dark Sleep
2021: The Box

References

External links 
 Homepage

Living people
American male composers
21st-century American composers
1941 births
21st-century American male musicians